Volkovo is a rural locality (a village) in Cherkassky Selsoviet, Ufimsky District, Bashkortostan, Russia. The population was 26 as of 2010.

Geography 
It is located 35 km from Ufa, 8 km from Cherkassy.

References 

Rural localities in Ufimsky District